Battle of Lemnos may refer to:
Battle of Lemnos (73 BC), between the navies of Rome and the Kingdom of Pontus
Battle of Lemnos (1024), between the Byzantines and Rus' raiders
Battle of Athos (1807), between the Russian and Ottoman fleets
Battle of Lemnos (1912), capture of the island by the Greeks
Battle of Lemnos (1913), between the Greek and Ottoman fleets